William E. Smith (born 19 November 1900) was a professional footballer who played for Hartlepool United, Huddersfield Town and Rochdale. He was born in Sheffield.

References

1900 births
Year of death missing
English footballers
Association football forwards
English Football League players
Hartlepool United F.C. players
Huddersfield Town A.F.C. players
Rochdale A.F.C. players
Footballers from Sheffield